Thomas Dillon, 4th Viscount Dillon PC (Ire) (1615–1673) held his title for 42 years that saw Strafford's administration, the Irish Rebellion of 1641, the Irish Confederate Wars and the Cromwellian Conquest of Ireland. He was a royalist and supported Strafford and Ormond. He sided with the Confederates for a while but was a moderate who opposed Rinuccini, the papal nuncio.

Lord Dillon fled the field at the Battle of Dungan's Hill (1647) and did not rescue Ormond at the Battle of Rathmines (1649). However, he defended Athlone successfully against Ireton in 1650.

Birth and origins 

Thomas was born in March 1615 in Ireland. He was the second son of Christopher Dillon and his wife Jane Dillon. His father was the eldest son and heir apparent of Theobald Dillon, 1st Viscount Dillon. Christopher predeceased his father and therefore never succeeded as viscount. He was a member of the landed gentry and known as Christopher Dillon of Ballylaghan in County Mayo.

Thomas's mother was the eldest daughter of James Dillon, 1st Earl of Roscommon. His father's and his mother's family were branches of the same widespread Old English family, established in Ireland in 1185 when Sir Henry Dillon accompanied Prince John to Ireland. His parents married in 1604 and had seven sons and five daughters.

Viscount 
His father died on 28 February 1624 when Thomas was eight years old. His grandfather, the 1st Viscount, followed him into the grave two weeks later on 15 March 1624. His elder brother Lucas succeeded his grandfather as the 2nd Viscount Dillon. This Lucas stayed viscount for about five years and died in 1629, leaving a three months old child, Theobald, who became the 3rd Viscount and a ward of the King but lasted only about a year dying on 13 May 1630 in his infancy. Thomas, being his uncle, succeeded as the 4th Viscount Dillon of Costello-Gallen. As he was 15 at the time, he became a ward and the estate was seized by the King, who sold the wardship to Thomas's uncle Lucas Dillon of Loughglynn. (see Family tree) and to Charles Wilmot, 1st Viscount Wilmot. Lord Dillon, as he was now, in that same year converted to Protestantism and was received into the Church of Ireland.

Marriage and children 
In 1635 Lord Dillon, aged about 20, married Frances White, daughter of Nicholas White, esquire, of Leixlip, a Protestant, and granddaughter of Garret Moore, 1st Viscount Moore by her mother Ursula Moore. She brought him a dowry of £3000 (about £ in ). Her sister Mary married Theobald Taaffe, the 2nd Viscount Taaffe (later 1st Earl of Carlingford), who thus became his brother-in-law.

 
Lucas and Frances had six sons and several daughters, who seem not to be known by name. The sons were:
 Charles (born 1636), became a general in French and Spanish service;
 Christopher (died 1663), never married;
 Rupert, died while being a page to Charles II, during his exile;
 Thomas (died 1674), became the 5th Viscount;
 Ormond, died young;
 Nicholas, died young.

Strafford's administration 
Thomas Wentworth, Viscount Wentworth, later the 1st Earl of Strafford, was appointed Lord Deputy of Ireland by Charles I on 12 April 1632. About 1636 Wentworth's sister Elizabeth married James Dillon, 3rd Earl of Roscommon, a first cousin on his mother's side. In January 1640 Wentworth was raised to Lord Lieutenant of Ireland. On 12 January 1640 Wentworth was created 1st Earl of Strafford.

Lord Strafford, as he now was, summoned an Irish Parliament in 1640. This was the second Irish parliament of King Charles I. On 16 March of that year, Lord Dillon took his seat in the House of Lords, which comprised all Irish peers and had a Catholic majority. The purpose of the parliament was to raise subsidies for an Irish army of 9000 for Charles I to fight the Scots in the Bishops' Wars. The Parliament unanimously voted four subsidies of £45,000. On 31 March 1640 parliament was prorogued until the first week of June.

On 3 April 1640 Strafford left Ireland, called elsewhere by the King, having appointed Christopher Wandesford as Lord Deputy. Wandesford opened the second parliamentary session on 1 June 1640. News from England was that the Short Parliament had refused subsidies to the King. The Irish MPs regretted having voted for subsidies and wanted to change how they would be evaluated and collected. After two weeks of inconclusive discussions, Wandesford prorogued parliament on 17 June.

When Parliament met again on 1 October, its mood had turned entirely against Strafford. The Commons sent a committee to England with a remonstrance that listed Strafford's excesses. Dillon together with Gormanston, Kilmallock and Muskerry were sent to London by the House of Lords to report grievances. Sometime in 1640 before the 23 October Lord Dillon was appointed a member of the Irish Privy council. Wandesford died on 3 December 1640 and was succeeded by Lord Leicester with the title of Lord Lieutenant of Ireland. Lord Leicester, however, never set foot on Irish soil.

Irish wars 
In October 1641 the Irish Rebellion broke out. In February 1642, the Irish Parliament sent Lord Dillon and his brother-in-law Lord Taaffe to England to submit grievances to Charles I. However, they were intercepted at Ware by order of the English House of Commons. They escaped a few months later and met the King at York. Upon Lord Dillon's return to Ireland, he was promoted Lieutenant-General.

On 15 September 1643 the Cessation, a ceasefire for one year was signed between the royalists and the Confederation. This cessation was renewed in September 1644.

In 1644 Lord Dillon was appointed joint President of Connaught together with Henry Wilmot, 2nd Viscount Wilmot, who had inherited his half of the presidency from his father, Charles Wilmot, 1st Viscount Wilmot in April 1644. Dillon replaced Roger Jones, 1st Viscount Ranelagh, who had died in 1643.

With the arrival of the papal nuncio, Giovanni Battista Rinuccini, in Ireland on 21 October 1645 Lord Dillon's Protestant religion caused him problems. He decided to convert back to Catholicism and on 6 December 1646 Lord Dillon was received back into the Roman Catholic Church by the Nuncio at St Mary's Church, Kilkenny. He had left Athlone under the command of Captain MacGawly, who betrayed him and handed the town over to Owen Roe O'Neill. After his conversion, the Confederate Council ordered O'Neill to give the town back to Lord Dillon, but O'Neill refused.

In August 1647, the Confederate Leinster army under Thomas Preston was severely beaten in the Battle of Dungan's Hill by Parliamentarian troops under Michael Jones. On this occasion Lord Dillon commanded the Confederate cavalry, which fled in the early stages of the battle.

Lord Dillon is mentioned several times in the Peace Treaty of 17 January 1649 between the Irish Confederates and Ormond, acting for Charles I, as "Thomas lord viscount Dillon of Costologh" (i.e. Costello-Gallen)". John Milton called him an "archrebel". He was one of the 12 commissioners of trust.

In 1649 Lord Dillon took part in Ormond's unsuccessful Siege of Dublin. He blockaded the Northside of the town with 2500 men and did not intervene, when General Michael Jones sallied in the south-east side of the town and defeated Ormond in the Battle of Rathmines on 2 August 1649. After the battle Ormond and Dillon retreated northwards to Trim. Some of his troops went to reinforce the garrison of Drogheda and were caught in the ensuing Siege of Drogheda by Cromwell, 3–11 September 1649.

In 1650 Lord Dillon successfully defended Athlone against a Parliamentarian army under Henry Ireton, skilfully holding him off by protracted parleys until Ireton decided to leave and rather reinforce Hardress Waller at the siege of Limerick. However, too much time had been lost and the parliamentarians took neither of these towns in the campaign of 1650. On 18 June 1651 Lord Dillon surrendered Athlone to Coote.

Lord Dillon's estates were confiscated by the Cromwellian Settlement of 1652, and he and his family lived in exile on the continent until the Restoration.

Restoration, later life, death, and timeline 
In 1662 he resigned the presidency of Connaught to Charles II for a payment of money. In 1663 most of his extensive lands were restored by the Act of Settlement 1662, and several high offices in the state were conferred upon him, including that of Custos Rotulorum of Westmeath. However, Dudley Costello, who was from a family of Gaelic freeholders that had been cheated out of their land by the 1st Viscount, resisted by organising rapparee actions. He was eventually shot in a skirmish in eastern County Mayo in 1667.

Lord Dillon died in 1673 and was succeeded by Thomas, his only surviving son, as the 5th Viscount. When the 5th Viscount died childless, the title passed to his first cousin Lucas, the 6th Viscount, and thereafter to the Loughglynn branch of the family, which descended from the 1st Viscount through his second son, Lucas Dillon of Loughglynn.

Most likely, Frances, his wife, outlived him and died in 1674, being buried in St. Mary's Chapel in Christ Church Cathedral. However, John Lodge thought that Frances was the Lady Dillon who has been recorded as dying in 1664 in Dillon's house in Winetavern Street, Dublin, and was buried at St James's.

Notes and references

Notes

Citations

Sources 

 
  – 1603 to 1642
  – 1642 to 1660 (for Scarrisholis and Charlemont)
  (for Strafford)
 
 (for Dillon)
  – 1660 to 1688 (for Dudley Costellogh)
 
  – S to T
  – Canonteign to Cutts (for Carlingford)
  – Dacre to Dysart (for Dillon)
  – N to R (for Ranelagh)
  – 1649 to 1782
  – Scotland and Ireland
 
  – (for timeline)
  – 1639 to 1641
  – 1649 to 1653
  (for the Battle of Rathmines)
 
 
 
  – Earls (for Drogheda)
  – Viscounts (for Dillon)
 
 
 
 
 
  – 1641 to 1643
  – 1643 to 1660 and index
 
 
 

 
 

1615 births
1673 deaths
17th-century Irish people
Irish expatriates
Irish soldiers in the Irish Confederate Wars
Members of the Privy Council of Ireland
People from County Mayo
Thomas 04